Unman, Wittering and Zigo is a 1958 radio play by the Anglo-Irish playwright Giles Cooper.

Plot
The play is set in a traditional boys’ boarding school. A teacher has died, apparently by accident: he fell off a cliff above the sea. John Ebony, a young man, is engaged to take his place; it is his first job and he hopes it will be permanent.

The class is strangely regimented and gradually the dialogue by class members becomes more ominous and threatening. They tell Ebony they killed the former teacher and show him the dead man's bloodstained wallet. They say they all have alibis. When Ebony reports this to the Headmaster, he brushes it off. When he seeks guidance from Cary Farthingale, the eccentric art master, he laughs. Ebony struggles to understand the truth, and who their leader might be.

Intimidated by his class, and scorned by his new wife Nadia, Ebony feels like a failure. When he refuses to teach, the boys organise their own education, and behave perfectly when the Headmaster comes in. The boys gamble on the horses, and Ebony consents to carry their bets to a bookmaker in the town; he declines a commission.

Wittering, the weakling of the class, kills himself, leaving a suicide note admitting that he planned the murder. But Ebony still does not know who actually committed it. The boys confess everything to the police or their parents.

Ebony asks Farthingale “who bound them together … who told them what to do.” Farthingale leads Ebony to acknowledge that it was authority, the teachers, including Ebony himself, who moulded them. Authority, Farthingale says, “is a necessary evil, and every bit as evil as it is necessary.”

Adaptations

The play was adapted for television as an episode of BBC 2's Theatre 625 series and broadcast in June 1965. It was the BBC's Italia Prize entry that year. It featured a number of young actors who gained a higher profile including Hywel Bennett and Dennis Waterman.

In 1967, the stage premiere was produced at Manchester Grammar School, directed by Brian Derbyshire and Brian Phythian, with Patrick Miller as John Ebony.

The play is part of the curriculum for GCSE and Standard Grade English coursework in the United Kingdom and is frequently performed in public schools. Cooper himself attended Lancing College in Sussex from 1932 to 1936.

A feature film version, directed by John Mackenzie, was released in 1971 with a screenplay by Simon Raven which stayed true to the basic plot, but added sexual scenes and changed Ebony's wife's name from Nadia to Sylvia. The 1971 film featured actors including David Hemmings and a young Michael Kitchen, and is also currently used for educational purposes in the UK.

In February 1990, a Wirral Grammar School for Boys Drama Society production, directed by Simon Carter, performed the play over 3 nights. The cast included Stephen Hughes as John Ebony, Kevin McDonnell as Cary Farthingale and Sonia Hardy as Nadia Ebony.

A reference to the play is made in the British TV series Little Britain, in which a schoolmaster finishes the morning roll call with "Unman, Wittering and Zigo absent", while Alan Bennett credits Giles Cooper and the play's influence in his creation of The History Boys.

Commercial release
The radio play was released in 2016 by Bournemouth University's Centre for Media History in a four CD set with three other Cooper radio plays, Mathray Beacon (1956), The Disagreeable Oyster (1957), and Under the Loofah Tree (1958).

References

External links 

British radio dramas